The Thulin LA was a Swedish two-seat, single-engine biplane designed by Enoch Thulin in 1917 and made by his company AB Thulinverken in Landskrona. It was based on the earlier Thulin L and E aircraft, with a new engine, fuselage and empennage. The L and E types were in turn based on the German Albatros B.II aircraft, like the NAB Albatros. The Thulin LA was used in Sweden, the Netherlands (10) and Finland (1). This type also made the first passenger transport flights between Sweden and Denmark in 1919. Altogether there were 15 Thulin LAs built.

Engine
The engine used was a Thulin G, which was an 11-cylinder  Le Rhône 11F (bore x stroke ), manufactured under licence by Thulinverken in Sweden.

Use in Finland
The Finnish Air Force (The Whites) received one aircraft as a gift from Sweden from the grocery magnate G. Svensson in the spring of 1918.

The aircraft arrived by ship at Turku on 5 May 1918, where it was used at the Turku Flying School (Turun Lentokoulu), established on 1 May 1918. The flying school was renamed V Flying Detachment (V Lento-osasto) of the Finnish Air Force on 1 October 1918. The aircraft was mainly used as a trainer aircraft and was destroyed in a crash due to engine malfunction outside Helsinki's Pohjoissatama harbour in February 1919.

Variants
Thulin also made a floatplane version of the LA, based on the Albatros B.II-W ("Wasserflugzeug").

Operators

Finnish Air Force

Royal Netherlands Navy

Swedish Air Force

Specifications (LA)

See also

References

Notes

Sources

 Keskinen, Kalevi; Stenman, Kari and Niska, Klaus: Suomen ilmavoimien lentokoneet 1918-1939, Tietoteos, 1976.

1910s Swedish military trainer aircraft
Biplanes
Single-engined tractor aircraft
Aircraft first flown in 1917
Rotary-engined aircraft